StartUp is an American streaming television crime drama series created by Ben Ketai that premiered on September 6, 2016, on Crackle. The series stars Adam Brody, Martin Freeman, Edi Gathegi, Otmara Marrero, Ron Perlman, Mira Sorvino and Addison Timlin. On November 15, 2017, the series was renewed for a third season which was released on November 1, 2018. The show was not renewed for a fourth season and, while never officially canceled, it is generally assumed to have ended.

Premise
StartUp follows "the emergence of GenCoin, a brilliant yet controversial tech idea centered on digital currency—an idea that gets incubated on the wrong side of the tracks by three strangers who do not necessarily fit the mold of tech entrepreneurs and a crooked FBI agent who will go to any lengths to take them down."

Cast and characters

Main
 Adam Brody as Nick Talman
 Edi Gathegi as Ronald Dacey
 Otmara Marrero as Izzy Morales
 Martin Freeman as Phil Rask aka "Rasky Boy" (seasons 1–2)
 Ron Perlman as Wes Chandler (seasons 2–3)
 Addison Timlin as Mara Chandler (season 3; recurring season 2), Wes' daughter.
 Mira Sorvino as Rebecca Stroud (season 3), an NSA agent who has come to investigate ArakNet, and will do whatever it takes to have ArakNet partner with the government.

Recurring
 Ashley Hinshaw as Taylor (season 1)
 Tony Plana as Mr. Morales, Izzy's father
 Jared Wofford as Frantz (seasons 1-3), Big Ronnie's second in command
 Jenny Gago as Marta Morales (seasons 1–2), Izzy's mother
 Kristen Ariza as Tamara Dacey, Ronald's wife
 Kelvin Harrison Jr. as Touie Dacey (seasons 1–2), Ronald's son
 Kamahl Naiqui as Oskar (season 1) JJ's second in command and Touie's main influence
 Génesis Castro Díaz as Elsie Dacey, Ronald's daughter
 Jocelin Donahue as Maddie Pierce (season 1)
 Wayne Knight as Benny Blush (season 1)
 Aaron Yoo as Alex Bell (seasons 1–2)
 Vera Cherny as Vera (seasons 1–2)
 Joshua Leonard as Rance (season 2)
 Reina Hardesty as Stella Namura (seasons 2–3)
 Tyler Labine as Martin Saginaw (season 3)
 Zachary Knighton as Tucker Saginaw (season 3)
 Allison Dunbar as Kelly (season 3), Wes' longtime friend and trusted lawyer.
 Michael McKiddy as Nico Wexler (seasons 1–2)

Episodes

Season 1 (2016)

Season 2 (2017)

Season 3 (2018)

Production

Development
On January 27, 2016, Crackle announced it had given the production a series order for a first season consisting of ten episodes. It was reported that executive producers were set to include Ben Ketai, Tom Forman, Andrew Marcus, Ray Ricord, Gianni Nunnari, and Shannon Gaulding. Ketai was also expected to serve as a writer and director on the series. Producers were announced to include Adam Brody and Anne Clements. Production companies involved with the series include Critical Content and Hollywood Gang Productions. On January 13, 2017, Crackle announced that they had renewed the series for a second season. On November 15, 2017, Crackle officially renewed the series for a third season. On August 27, 2018, it was announced the third season would premiere on November 1, 2018.

Casting
Simultaneously alongside the initial series order announcement, it was confirmed that the series would star Martin Freeman, Adam Brody, Edi Gathegi, and Otmara Marrero. That same day, it was reported that Jocelin Donahue had been cast in a recurring role. On March 17, 2016, Ashley Hinshaw joined the show in a starring role. On April 19, 2017, it was announced that Ron Perlman and Addison Timlin had joined the series' main cast. On January 14, 2018, it was reported that Mira Sorvino would appear in the third season in a guest starring role. On February 7, 2018, it was announced that Allison Dunbar joined the series in recurring role. The show was cast by Bonnie Wu, Dylann Brander, Erica Johnson and Aaron Griffith.

Filming
Principal photography for season one began during the week of January 25, 2016, in San Juan, Puerto Rico.

Release

Marketing
On July 27, 2016, Crackle released the first official trailer for the series. On August 7, 2017, Crackle released a trailer for the second season. On August 7, 2018, Crackle released a trailer for the third season.

The series began streaming on Netflix on May 4, 2021. Since being released on Netflix, the show earned a place in the Netflix Top 10. This generated buzz about whether or not there would be a season four, with speculation that Netflix could potentially pick it up in order to film the next season.

Premiere
On September 21, 2018, the series held the world premiere of its third season during the second annual Tribeca TV Festival in New York City. Following a screening, a conversation was held featuring members of the cast and crew including director Ben Ketai and actors Edi Gathegi, Ron Perlman, Adam Brody, and Otmara Marrero.

Reception
The series received mixed reviews from critics. On the review aggregation website Rotten Tomatoes, season 1 of StartUp holds an average approval rating of 36% based on reviews from 14 critics. The website's critical consensus reads, "StartUp is a LetDown." Metacritic, which uses a weighted average, assigned the series a score of 52 out of 100 based on 14 reviews, indicating "mixed or average reviews".

References

External links

2010s American drama television series
2010s American LGBT-related drama television series
2016 American television series debuts
2018 American television series endings
Bisexuality-related television series
Crackle (streaming service) original programming
English-language television shows
Television series by Sony Pictures Television
Television shows set in Miami
Television shows filmed in Puerto Rico